In mathematics, a vector-valued differential form on a manifold M is a differential form on M with values in a vector space V. More generally, it is a differential form with values in some vector bundle E over M. Ordinary differential forms can be viewed as R-valued differential forms.

An important case of vector-valued differential forms are Lie algebra-valued forms. (A connection form is an example of such a form.)

Definition

Let M be a smooth manifold and E → M be a smooth vector bundle over M. We denote the space of smooth sections of a bundle E by Γ(E). An E-valued differential form of degree p is a smooth section of the tensor product bundle of E with Λp(T ∗M), the p-th exterior power of the cotangent bundle of M. The space of such forms is denoted by

Because Γ is a strong monoidal functor, this can also be interpreted as

where the latter two tensor products are the tensor product of modules over the ring Ω0(M) of smooth R-valued functions on M (see the seventh example here).  By convention, an E-valued 0-form is just a section of the bundle E. That is,

Equivalently, an E-valued differential form can be defined as a bundle morphism

which is totally skew-symmetric.

Let V be a fixed vector space. A V-valued differential form of degree p is a differential form of degree p with values in the trivial bundle M × V. The space of such forms is denoted Ωp(M, V). When V = R one recovers the definition of an ordinary differential form.  If V is finite-dimensional, then one can show that the natural homomorphism

where the first tensor product is of vector spaces over R, is an isomorphism.

Operations on vector-valued forms

Pullback

One can define the pullback of vector-valued forms by smooth maps just as for ordinary forms. The pullback of an E-valued form on N by a smooth map φ : M → N is an (φ*E)-valued form on M, where φ*E is the pullback bundle of E by φ.

The formula is given just as in the ordinary case. For any E-valued p-form ω on N the pullback φ*ω is given by

Wedge product

Just as for ordinary differential forms, one can define a wedge product of vector-valued forms. The wedge product of an E1-valued p-form with an E2-valued q-form is naturally an (E1⊗E2)-valued (p+q)-form:

The definition is just as for ordinary forms with the exception that real multiplication is replaced with the tensor product:

In particular, the wedge product of an ordinary (R-valued) p-form with an E-valued q-form is naturally an E-valued (p+q)-form (since the tensor product of E with the trivial bundle M × R is naturally isomorphic to E). For ω ∈ Ωp(M) and η ∈ Ωq(M, E) one has the usual commutativity relation:

In general, the wedge product of two E-valued forms is not another E-valued form, but rather an (E⊗E)-valued form. However, if E is an algebra bundle (i.e. a bundle of algebras rather than just vector spaces) one can compose with multiplication in E to obtain an E-valued form. If E is a bundle of commutative, associative algebras then, with this modified wedge product, the set of all E-valued differential forms

becomes a graded-commutative associative algebra. If the fibers of E are not commutative then Ω(M,E) will not be graded-commutative.

Exterior derivative

For any vector space V there is a natural exterior derivative on the space of V-valued forms. This is just the ordinary exterior derivative acting component-wise relative to any basis of V. Explicitly, if {eα} is a basis for V then the differential of a V-valued p-form ω = ωαeα is given by

The exterior derivative on V-valued forms is completely characterized by the usual relations:

More generally, the above remarks apply to E-valued forms where E is any flat vector bundle over M (i.e. a vector bundle whose transition functions are constant). The exterior derivative is defined as above on any local trivialization of E.

If E is not flat then there is no natural notion of an exterior derivative acting on E-valued forms. What is needed is a choice of connection on E. A connection on E is a linear differential operator taking sections of E to E-valued one forms:

If E is equipped with a connection ∇ then there is a unique covariant exterior derivative

extending ∇. The covariant exterior derivative is characterized by linearity and the equation

where ω is a E-valued p-form and η is an ordinary q-form. In general, one need not have d∇2 = 0. In fact, this happens if and only if the connection ∇ is flat (i.e. has vanishing curvature).

Basic or tensorial forms on principal bundles

Let E → M be a smooth vector bundle of rank k over M and let π : F(E) → M be the (associated) frame bundle of E, which is a principal GLk(R) bundle over M. The pullback of E by π is canonically isomorphic to F(E) ×ρ Rk via the inverse of [u, v] →u(v), where ρ is the standard representation. Therefore, the pullback by π of an E-valued form on M determines an Rk-valued form on F(E). It is not hard to check that this pulled back form is right-equivariant with respect to the natural action of GLk(R) on F(E) × Rk and vanishes on vertical vectors (tangent vectors to F(E) which lie in the kernel of dπ). Such vector-valued forms on F(E) are important enough to warrant special terminology: they are called basic or tensorial forms on F(E).

Let π : P → M be a (smooth) principal G-bundle and let V be a fixed vector space together with a representation ρ : G → GL(V). A basic or tensorial form on P of type ρ is a V-valued form ω on P which is equivariant and horizontal in the sense that
 for all g ∈ G, and
 whenever at least one of the vi are vertical (i.e., dπ(vi) = 0).
Here Rg denotes the right action of G on P for some g ∈ G. Note that for 0-forms the second condition is vacuously true.

Example: If ρ is the adjoint representation of G on the Lie algebra, then the connection form ω satisfies the first condition (but not the second). The associated curvature form Ω satisfies both; hence Ω is a tensorial form of adjoint type. The "difference" of two connection forms is a tensorial form.

Given P and ρ as above one can construct the associated vector bundle E = P ×ρ V. Tensorial q-forms on P are in a natural one-to-one correspondence with E-valued q-forms on M. As in the case of the principal bundle F(E) above, given a q-form  on M with values in E, define φ on P fiberwise by, say at u,

where u is viewed as a linear isomorphism . φ is then a tensorial form of type ρ. Conversely, given a tensorial form φ of type ρ, the same formula defines an E-valued form  on M (cf. the Chern–Weil homomorphism.) In particular, there is a natural isomorphism of vector spaces
.

Example: Let E be the tangent bundle of M. Then identity bundle map idE: E →E is an E-valued one form on M. The tautological one-form is a unique one-form on the frame bundle of E that corresponds to idE. Denoted by θ, it is a tensorial form of standard type.

Now, suppose there is a connection on P so that there is an exterior covariant differentiation D on (various) vector-valued forms on P. Through the above correspondence, D also acts on E-valued forms: define ∇ by

In particular for zero-forms,
.

This is exactly the covariant derivative for the connection on the vector bundle E.

Examples
Siegel modular forms arise as vector-valued differential forms on Siegel modular varieties.

Notes

References
 Shoshichi Kobayashi and Katsumi Nomizu (1963) Foundations of Differential Geometry, Vol. 1, Wiley Interscience.

Differential forms
Vector bundles